Ulrich Bonnell Phillips (November 4, 1877 – January 21, 1934) was an American historian who largely defined the field of the social and economic studies of the history of the Antebellum South and slavery in the U.S. Phillips concentrated on the large plantations that dominated the Southern economy, and he did not investigate the numerous small farmers who held few slaves. He concluded that plantation slavery produced great wealth, but was a dead end, economically, that left the South bypassed by the industrial revolution underway in the North.

Phillips concluded that plantation slavery was not very profitable, had about reached its geographical limits in 1860, and would probably have faded away without the American Civil War, which he considered needless conflict. He praised the entrepreneurship of plantation owners and denied they were brutal.  Phillips argued that they provided adequate food, clothing, housing, medical care and training in modern technology—that they formed a "school" which helped "civilize" the slaves. He admitted the failure was that no one graduated from this school.

Phillips systematically hunted down and revealed plantation records and unused manuscript sources. An example of pioneering comparative work was "A Jamaica Slave Plantation" (1914). His methods and use of sources shaped the research agenda of most succeeding scholars, even those who disagreed with his favorable treatment of the masters. After the civil rights movement of the 1960s historians turned their focus away from his emphasis on the material well-being of the slaves to the slaves' own cultural constructs and efforts to achieve freedom.

By turning away from the political debates about slavery that divided North and South, Phillips made the economics and social structure of slavery the main theme in 20th century scholarship. Together with his highly eloquent writing style, his new approach made him the most influential historian of the antebellum south.

Biography
He was born on November 4, 1877, in LaGrange, Georgia; his parents were Alonzo R. and Jessie Young Phillips.  He graduated with a Bachelor of Arts degree from the University of Georgia in 1897. He obtained his Master of Arts degree from UGA as well in 1899 and his Ph.D. in 1902 from Columbia University where he studied under William Dunning. His dissertation, Georgia and State Rights won the Justin Winsor Prize in 1901 and was published by the American Historical Association.

Phillips was especially influenced by Frederick Jackson Turner who invited Phillips to the University of Wisconsin where Phillips taught from 1902 to 1908. He taught for three years at Tulane University. In 1911, Phillips moved to the University of Michigan where he taught until 1929 when he left to teach at Yale as Professor of American History until his death in 1934.  In the 1920s he spent a year in Africa traveling and doing research.  He received an honorary D. Litt. from Columbia University in 1929.

He married Lucil Mayo-Smith on February 22, 1911, and had three children: Ulrich, Mabel, and Worthington.

Historiography

Some of Phillips's views were rejected in the 1950s, but they were revived again in the 1960s. As Harvard Sitkoff wrote in 1986, "[I]n the mid-1960s Eugene D. Genovese launched a rehabilitation of Phillips that still continues. Today, as in Phillips's lifetime, scholars again commonly acknowledge the value of many of his insights into the nature of the southern class structure and master-slave relationships."

The Phillips school asked, what did slavery do for the slaves? As the historian Herbert Gutman noted, the Phillipsian answer was that slavery lifted the slaves out of the barbarism of Africa, Christianized them, protected them, and generally benefited them. Scholarship in the 1950s then moved to the question, what did slavery do to the slaves, and concluded it was a harsh and profitable system. More recently, scholars such as Genovese and Gutman asked, "What did slaves do for themselves?" They concluded "In the slave quarters, through family, community and religion, slaves struggled for a measure of independence and dignity.

Phillips concluded slavery was inefficient
Phillips argued that large-scale plantation slavery was inefficient and not progressive. It had reached its geographical limits by 1860 or so, and eventually had to fade away (as happened in Brazil). In 1910, he argued in "The Decadence of the Plantation System" that slavery was an unprofitable relic that persisted because it produced social status, honor, and political power, that is, Slave Power.

Phillips' economic conclusions about the inefficiency of slavery were challenged by Alfred H. Conrad and John R. Meyer, and Robert Fogel in the 1950s and 1960s, who argued that slavery was both efficient and profitable as long as the price of cotton was high enough. In turn Fogel came under sharp attack by other scholars.

An essay by the historians George M. Fredrickson and Christopher Lasch (1967) analyzed limitations of both Phillips and his critics. They argued that far too much attention was given to slave "treatment" in examining the social and psychological effects of slavery on Afro-Americans. They said Phillips had defined the treatment issue and his most severe critics had failed to redefine it:

By compiling instances of the kindness and benevolence of masters, Phillips proved to his satisfaction that slavery was a mild and permissive institution, the primary function of which was not so much to produce a marketable surplus as to ease the accommodation of the lower race into the culture of the higher. The critics of Phillips have tried to meet him on his own ground. Where he compiled lists of indulgences and benefactions, they have assembled lists of atrocities. Both methods suffer from the same defect: they attempt to solve a conceptual problem—what did slavery do to the slave?—by accumulating quantitative evidence.... The only conclusion that one can legitimately draw from this debate is that great variations in treatment existed from plantation to plantation.

Biases
John David Smith of North Carolina State University argues:

[He was] a conservative, proslavery interpreter of slavery and the slaves ... In Life and Labor in the Old South Phillips failed to revise his interpretation of slavery significantly. His basic arguments—the duality of slavery as an economic cancer but a vital mode of racial control—can be traced back to his earliest writings. Less detailed but more elegantly written than American Negro Slavery, Phillips's Life and Labor was a general synthesis rather than a monograph. His racism appeared less pronounced in Life and Labor because of its broad scope. Fewer racial slurs appeared in 1929 than in 1918, but Phillips's prejudice remained. The success of Life and Labor earned Phillips the year-long Albert Kahn Foundation Fellowship in 1929-30 to observe blacks and other laborers worldwide. In 1929 Yale University in New Haven, Connecticut, appointed Phillips professor of history.

Phillips contended that masters treated slaves relatively well.  His views  were rejected most sharply by Kenneth M. Stampp in the 1950s. However, to a large degree Phillips' interpretive model of the dynamic between master and slave was revived by  Eugene Genovese, who wrote that Phillips's "work, taken as a whole, remains the best and most subtle introduction to antebellum Southern history and especially to the problems posed by race and class." In 1963, C. Vann Woodward wrote: "Much of what Phillips wrote has not been superseded or seriously challenged and remains indispensable."

Phillips denied he was proslavery. He was an intellectual leader of the Progressive Movement and slavery, in his interpretation, was inefficient and antithetical to the principles of progressivism.  Phillips (1910) explained in detail why slavery was a failed system. It is Smith's opinion that:

Phillips's contributions to the study of slavery clearly outweigh his deficiencies. Neither saint nor sinner, he was subject to the same forces-- bias, selectivity of evidence, inaccuracy--that plague us all. Descended from slave owners and reared in the rural South, he dominated slave historiography in an era when Progressivism was literally for whites only. Of all scholars, historians can ill afford to be anachronistic. Phillips was no more a believer in white supremacy than other leading contemporary white scholars.W. E. B. Du Bois criticized Phillips's 1918 book American Negro Slavery, writing that it was a "defense of American slavery" and that Phillips engaged in the special pleading fallacy.

Race as "central theme" of southern U.S. history
In "The Central Theme of Southern History" (1928), Phillips maintained that the desire to keep their region "a white man's country" united the white southerners for centuries.  Phillips' emphasis on race was overshadowed in the late 1920s and 1930s by the Beardian interpretation of Charles A. Beard and Mary Ritter Beard, who in their enormously successful The Rise of American Civilization (1927) emphasized class conflict and downplayed slavery and race relations as a cause of the American Civil War. By the 1950s, however, the Beardian economic determinism was out of fashion, and the emphasis on race (rather than region or class) became a major topic in historiography.

By 2000, Jane Dailey, Glenda Gilmore, and Bryant Simon argue by citing Phillips:

The ways in which white southerners "met" the race "problem" have intrigued historians writing about post-Civil War southern politics since at least 1928, when Ulrich B. Phillips pronounced race relations the "central theme" of southern history. What contemporaries referred to as "the race question" may be phrased more bluntly today as the struggle for white domination. Establishing and maintaining this domination--creating the system of racial segregation and African American disfranchisement known as Jim Crow--has remained a preoccupation of southern historians.

In his review of Complicity: How the North Promoted, Prolonged, and Profited From Slavery by Anne Farrow, Joel Lang and Jenifer Frank, the historian Ira Berlin wrote, "Slavery in the North, like its counterpart in the South, was a brutal, violent relationship that fostered white supremacy. Complicity'''s authors shred the notion, famously advanced by the Yale historian U.B. Phillips, that the central theme of Southern history was the region's desire to remain a white man's country. Phillips was not so much wrong about the centrality of white supremacy to the South as blind to its presence in the North."

Works
For a comprehensive annotated guide see Fred Landon and Everett E. Edwards, "A Bibliography of the Writings of Professor Ulrich Bonnell Phillips," (1934).
 Georgia and State Rights: A Study of the Political History of Georgia from the Revolution to the Civil War, with Particular Regard to Federal Relations. American Historical Association Report for the Year 1901, Vol. 2. Washington: Government Printing Office, 1902, his dissertation, earned him the Justin Winsor Prize awarded by the American Historical Association (reprint 1983)  online edition
 A History of Transportation in the Eastern Cotton Belt to 1860. (1908).  online edition
 The Life of Robert Toombs. (1913). online edition
 American Negro Slavery: A Survey of the Supply, Employment, and Control of Negro Labor, as Determined by the Plantation Regime. (1918; reprint 1966)online at Project Gutenberg; online at Internet Archive
 Life and Labor in the Old South. (1929).  excerpts and text search
 The Course of the South to Secession: An Interpretation. (1939).  online edition

Works edited by Phillips
 Plantation and Frontier Documents, 1649–1863; Illustrative of Industrial History in the Colonial and Antebellum South: Collected from MSS. and Other Rare Sources. 2 Volumes. (1909). vol 1&2 online edition
 The Correspondence of Robert Toombs, Alexander H. Stephens, and Howell Cobb. Annual Report of the American Historical Association for the Year 1911, Vol. 2. Washington: 1913.
 Florida Plantation Records from the Papers of George Noble Jones. (coedited with James D. Glunt). (1927).

Major articles by Ulrich B. Phillips

 "Calhoun, John Caldwell, 1782 - 1850" Dictionary of American Biography (1929)  3:411-419;  7400 words

References

Bibliography

 Dillon, Merton Lynn. Ulrich Bonnell Phillips: Historian of the Old South (1985), biography. 
 Fogel, Robert William, and Engerman, Stanley L.  Time on the Cross:  The Economics of American Negro Slavery, (1974), 1995 reissue, New York:  Norton, .
 Fogel, Robert William. The Slavery Debates, 1952-1990: A Retrospective Louisiana State University Press, 2003. , chapter 1.
 Genovese, Eugene D. "Race and Class in Southern History: An Appraisal of the Work of Ulrich Bonnell Phillips." Agricultural History, 41 (October, 1967): 345-358.  in JSTOR
 Genovese, Eugene D. "Ulrich Bonnell Phillips & His Critics." [Introduction to] Ulrich Bonnell Phillips. American Negro Slavery: A Survey of the Supply, Employment and Control of Negro Labor as Determined by the Plantation Regime Louisiana State University Press, 1966, pages vii-xxi.
 Hofstadter Richard. "U.B. Phillips and the Plantation Legend." Journal of Negro History, 29 (April, 1944): 109-124.  in JSTOR
 Kugler, Ruben F. "U.B. Phillips' Use of Sources." Journal of Negro History, 47 (July, 1962): 153-168. in JSTOR
 Landon, Fred, and Everett E. Edwards. "A Bibliography of the Writings of Professor Ulrich Bonnell Phillips," Agricultural History, Vol. 8, No. 4 (Oct., 1934), pp. 196–218 in JSTOR
 Parish, Peter J. Slavery: history and historians (2nd. ed. 1990)
 Potter, David M. "The Work of Ulrich B. Phillips: A Comment." Agricultural History, 41 (October, 1967): 359-363.  in JSTOR
 Pressly, Thomas J. "Ulrich B. Phillips." In Americans Interpret Their Civil War (Princeton University Press, 1962), pages 265-272.
 Roper, John Herbert. U.B. Phillips: A Southern Mind Mercer University Press, 1984.
 Singal, Daniel Joseph. "Ulrich B. Phillips: The Old South as the New," Journal of American History, 63 (March, 1977): 871-891. in JSTOR
 Smith, John David. An Old Creed for the New South: Proslavery Ideology and Historiography, 1865-1918 Greenwood Press, 1985, Chapter 8.
 Smith, John David; and John C. Inscoe eds; Ulrich Bonnell Phillips: A Southern Historian and His Critics (1990)   online, essays by leading scholars, pro and con
 Smith, John David. "Ulrich Bonnell Phillips (1877-1934)" in The New Georgia Encyclopedia (2003)  online version
 Smith, John David. Slavery, Race and American History: Historical Conflict, Trends and Method, 1866-1953 (1999)
 Smith, John David. "U. B. Phillips, the North Carolina State Literary and Historical Association, and the Course of the South to Secession," North Carolina Historical Review, (2010) 87#3 pp 253–282
 Stampp Kenneth M. "Reconsidering U.B. Phillips: A Comment." Agricultural History, 41 (October, 1967): 365-368.  in JSTOR
 Stampp Kenneth M. "The Historian and Southern Negro Slavery." American Historical Review, 57 (April, 1952): 613-624.  in JSTOR
Stephenson Wendell H. "Ulrich B. Phillips: Historian of Aristocracy." in The South Lives in History: Southern Historians and Their Legacy Louisiana State University Press, 1955, pages 58–94.
 Tindall George B. "The Central Theme Revisited." In Charles G. Sellers Jr., ed. The Southerner as American University of North Carolina Press, 1960, pages 104-129.
 Wish Harvey. "Ulrich B. Phillips and the Image of the Old South." in Wish, The American Historian: A Social-Intellectual History of the Writing of the American Past Oxford University Press, 1960, pp. 236–264.
 Wood, Kirk. "Ulrich B. Phillips." In Clyde N. Wilson, ed. Dictionary of Literary Biography, Twentieth-Century American Historians. Gale Research, 1983, pages 350-363.
 Woodward C. Vann. "Introduction" in Ulrich B. Phillips. Life and Labor in the Old South''. Boston: Little, Brown and Company, 1963, pages iii-vi.

External links

 
 
 Biography
 Ulrich Bonnell Phillips papers (MS 397). Manuscripts and Archives, Yale University Library. 

1877 births
1934 deaths
People from Troup County, Georgia
Historians of the Southern United States
Historians of the United States
Deaths from esophageal cancer
University of Georgia alumni
Yale University faculty
Deaths from cancer in Connecticut
University of Michigan faculty
Dunning School
Historians from Georgia (U.S. state)